Gregor Seberg (born 24 July 1967 in Graz) is an Austrian actor.

Life
He moved to Vienna aged 13 and studied German studies and theatre studies for a few semesters before moving to the Vienna Conservatoire to study acting. He then worked as a freelance actor, director and writer. For two years he was co-host of Talk Radio on Ö3. Seberg is a co-founder of the theatre group 'Ateatta' and played Alex in a theatre version of A Clockwork Orange. Other acting theatre roles include the one man show Sex, Drugs, Rock&Roll as well as Richard III, Onkel Wanja, Der Widerspenstigen Zähmung (Petruchio), Die 3 von der Tankstelle (Kurt), Entführung aus dem Serail (Bassa Selim), Weh’ dem, der lügt (Leon) and Cyrano de Bergerac (Cyrano).
Between 2005 and 2017 Helmuth Nowak in SOKO Donau.

References

Sources
 

Actors from Graz
Living people
Austrian male stage actors
1967 births
Austrian male television actors